Route nationale 118 is now a French route nationale from Sèvres to Les Ulis.

History
The route was created in 1972. It takes the place of route nationale 187 between Sèvres and Meudon la Forêt, of the route nationale 306 between Saclay and Bièvres and of the route nationale 446 between Saclay and Orsay.

Exit list

118